Şevket Müftügil (7 August 1917 – 22 April 2015) was a Turkish judge. He was president of the Constitutional Court of Turkey from October 24, 1978 until August 7, 1982.

References

External links
Web-site of the Constitutional Court of Turkey 

1917 births
2015 deaths
Presidents of the Constitutional Court of Turkey
Turkish civil servants
Turkish judges
Istanbul University Faculty of Law alumni